Poltár District (okres Poltár) is a district in the south of
the Banská Bystrica Region of central Slovakia. It was established in 1996. In its present borders exists from 2002, when municipalities Pinciná and Nové Hony were assigned to the Lučenec District. It is the sixth smallest district in Slovakia. Poltár District consists of 22 municipalities, from which one has a town status.

Municipalities

References

Districts of Slovakia
Geography of Banská Bystrica Region